Kirk LeMoyne "Lem" Billings (April 15, 1916 – May 28, 1981) was an American businessman known for his close and long-time friendship with John F. Kennedy and the Kennedy family.  Billings was a prep school roommate of Kennedy, an usher at his wedding and a campaigner for his successful 1960 presidential bid. Joseph Kennedy Sr. called him "my second son," and he sometimes acted as escort for several of the Kennedy women. Billings served with Sargent Shriver as a trustee for the Kennedy family trusts.

Early years
Billings was born in Pittsburgh, Pennsylvania, on April 15, 1916, the third child of Frederic Tremaine Billings (1873–1933) and Romaine LeMoyne (1882–1970). His father was a prominent physician and a graduate of the U.S. Naval Academy. His mother was a Mayflower descendant and his great-grandfather Francis Julius LeMoyne was a prominent abolitionist linked to the underground railroad who helped establish what is today known as LeMoyne-Owen College. The Billings family were Episcopalians and Republicans.

Billings, a 16-year-old third-year student, and Kennedy, a 15-year-old second-year student, met at Choate, an elite preparatory school, in the fall of 1933. Billings as a teenager was 6' 2", weighed 175 pounds, and was the strongest member of the Choate crew. They became fast friends, drawn to each other by their mutual distaste for their strict school. While at Choate, they formed a club and called themselves "The Muckers". The Muckers would pull pranks around the school and even planned to dump horse manure in the school gym, but that fell through after the headmaster found out. Billings' first visit with the Kennedy family was for Christmas in Palm Beach in 1933; after that, he joined them for holidays, participated in family events, and was treated like a member of the family. The Depression had hurt the Billings family financially, and Lem Billings was at Choate on scholarship. Billings repeated his senior year so that he and Kennedy could graduate from Choate together in 1935.

In the summer of 1937, Billings and Kennedy took a summer trip through Europe which solidified their friendship.

In 1939, Billings graduated from Princeton where he majored in art and architecture and wrote his senior thesis on Tintoretto.

In 1941, Billings failed medical tests required by the military. In 1942, supported by a recommendation from Joseph Kennedy Sr., his friend's father, who called him "my second son", he won admission to the American Ambulance Field Service, where his poor eyesight was not a disqualification. He saw action in North Africa in 1942–43. In 1944, he received a commission in the U.S. Naval Reserve and served in the South Pacific until being discharged in 1946.

After working on Kennedy's successful campaign for Congress in 1946, Billings toured seven Latin American countries with Robert F. Kennedy.

Career
From 1946 to 1948, Billings attended Harvard Business School and earned an MBA.  He later had several jobs, including selling Coca-Cola dispensers to drugstores and working at a General Shoe store. As Vice President at the Emerson Drug Company in Baltimore, he was responsible for inventing the 1950s fad drink Fizzies by adding a fruit flavor to disguise the sodium citrate taste. In 1958, he moved to the Manhattan advertising firm Lennen & Newell as an advertising executive.

On September 12, 1953, Billings was an usher at the wedding of Kennedy and Jacqueline Lee Bouvier. In 1956, he was an usher at the wedding of Kennedy's sister Jean to Stephen Edward Smith.

In 1960, on leave from his job, he worked on Kennedy's presidential campaign. He managed the campaign in the Third Congressional District in the Wisconsin primary and then served as general troubleshooter and coordinator of television in the West Virginia primary.

Kennedy administration

In 1961, Billings declined Kennedy's offer to appoint him the first head of the Peace Corps, director of a new agency to promote tourism, the U.S. Travel Service, or ambassador to Denmark. He later said: "I realized that I did not want to work for the president — because I felt it would change our relationship."  In September 1961, he accepted an appointment to the board of trustees of the planned National Cultural Center, which later became the Kennedy Center. The next year, Kennedy named him to a board to plan America's participation in the New York World's Fair of 1964–5. He represented the President when the alumni association unveiled Kennedy's portrait at Choate in May 1963.

Billings visited the White House for most weekends during the Kennedy Administration. When a butler commented on the fact that Billings was leaving his belongings in one of the third-floor guest rooms, the First Lady replied: "He's been my house guest since I was married." Sometimes he stayed for longer periods. When the First Lady was away, Billings organized White House dinner parties for the President and old friends, and when the President traveled he kept the First Lady company. One presidential aide later said that "some people saw him so much they thought he was the Secret Service." Billings never had a White House pass and said: "Jack and Jackie were so nice about this that I didn't even have to tell them whether I was coming or going." Historian Sally Bedell Smith compared him to Leonard Zelig, a nondescript character in Woody Allen's 1983 film who is always present in the back row at major events. He sat with the President's family at the Kennedy inauguration and walked not far behind his widow at the Kennedy funeral.

The press frequently reported on his presence at Kennedy family events, such as the arrival of the Kennedy children in Washington in February 1961. He accompanied the President to church, launched a kite for the President's daughter Caroline, and delivered pet hamsters to the Kennedy children. He joined the President's entourage for his tours of Europe in both 1961 and 1963. In 1962 he escorted two of the President's sisters, Eunice Shriver and Jean Kennedy Smith, around Europe for more than two weeks.  When the Kennedys spent the weekend at Glen Ora, their Virginia estate, Jacqueline Kennedy invited Billings to join them more often than the President did. She needed Billings to keep the President company while she went horseback riding.

Billings' role as "first friend" was assessed by many observers at the time and since. Ted Sorensen called him "an admirer — almost a fawning admirer — of his friend." Arthur Schlesinger thought Billings "used to glare at me when we occasionally encountered each other in the company of JFK, and for a time I took this rather personally. Soon I discovered that he glared with equal suspicion at anyone whose friendship with JFK postdated his own." Another said: "Members of the president's staff thought of him as a 'handy old piece of furniture.'"

Most recognized that Billings and Kennedy had been friends from youth and did not question their relationship or Billings' presence. Ben Bradlee, a Kennedy friend who worked at Newsweek during the Kennedy Administration, and no friend of Billings, said "they were childhood friends and stayed loyal to each other forever." Billings, he said, "had a natural jealousy. He didn't want to share his friendship with Jack." Gore Vidal, who was banned from the White House after a run-in with Billings, was critical of Billings, but also thought Billings played an important role as an aide to Kennedy, who was often ill or in pain. "He needed Lem Billings to get around — better than a trained nurse" that would have made his political career impossible. Vidal thought Jacqueline Kennedy thought Billings "was kind of a nothing ... but Jack needed him and she was practical."

Many testify to Billings' wit and ability to help the President relax. He once described the Kennedy family's lack of business awareness: "Listening to the Kennedy brothers talk about business was like hearing nuns talk about sex." Billings also served the President as an artistic adviser, selecting scrimshaw for display in the Oval Office and, on one European tour, quickly assembling a selection of artworks to be presented as gifts.

Billings spent less time with the President in the fall of 1963. One of their friends thought "that Jackie was trying to close Lem out." Billings spent the last weekend of October 1963 with the couple, the last time he saw them together. Billings saw the President for the last time when they dined at the White House with Greta Garbo on November 13, 1963, nine days before the President's assassination in Dallas.

Personal life
Friends from the 1970s confirmed that Billings was homosexual, but not open to discussing it. In 2006, looking back to the Kennedy Administration, Ben Bradlee said: "I suppose it's known that Lem was gay....It impressed me that Jack had gay friends." At the same time, he admitted that no one ever expressed the idea aloud during Kennedy's White House years. Red Fay, a friend of the President from his World War II service, said of Billings: "I didn't see anything overtly gay about him; I think he was neutral." One historian wrote that after the 1963 assassination Billings was:  "probably the saddest of the Kennedy 'widows'." Though newspapers often mentioned Billings' attendance at major social events, they identified him either as the escort of a member of the Kennedy family or included him in a list of Kennedy friends. Otherwise he attended without female accompaniment.  Billings had his own room in the White House.

Some historians believe that Billings expressed his sexual interest in Kennedy in writing in 1934 and that Kennedy rebuffed his advances. Kennedy knew that homosexual behavior on the part of Billings had been revealed by a fellow Choate student during their years there. Charles L. Bartlett, a journalist who introduced Kennedy to Jacqueline Bouvier and friend of both Billings and Kennedy, described their relationship: "Lem was a stable presence for Jack. Lem's raison d'être was Jack Kennedy. I don't think it's true that he did not have views of his own, as some have said. He had a very independent mind. He had interests of his own that Jack didn't necessarily share. He certainly didn't have the same interest in politics and women that Jack had." Though Gore Vidal thought Billings was "absolutely nobody," he also believed "it was a good idea that Jack had somebody he could trust like that around him." He believed Billings loved Kennedy. "Jack made a big difference in my life," Billings said. "Because of him, I was never lonely. He may have been the reason I never got married."

Later years
In 1964, Billings was named to select a memorial to Kennedy to be placed in the Kennedy Center. In 1965, Jacqueline Kennedy invited Billings to accompany her and her children to England for the unveiling of a memorial to President Kennedy at Runnymede.

He escorted Jean Kennedy Smith, sister of the President, to a gala ballet performance in 1966 and Ethel Kennedy, the president's sister-in-law, to the 1971 opening of the Kennedy Center.

After the assassination of Robert F. Kennedy in 1968, Billings became depressed and started to drink in excess, an addiction that plagued him for most of his life. He maintained close ties to the Kennedys and their children for the rest of his life, frequently socializing with Bobby Kennedy Jr., to whom he became almost a surrogate father, and Christopher Lawford.

Billings' behavior changed drastically in the late 1960s. According to Kennedy family members, such as Peter Lawford, and others, Billings began using drugs due to the influence of the Kennedy and Lawford boys. The elder Kennedys began to discourage the boys from associating with Billings because of his excessive recreational drug use (including alcohol).

Billings served for many years along with Sargent Shriver as a trustee for the Kennedy family trusts, working from an office in the Pan Am Building. Jacqueline Kennedy Onassis included Billings as a guest at a party marking the birthdays of her children Caroline (21st) and John Jr. (18th) in 1978.

In 1987, historian Doris Kearns Goodwin described how Billings structured her interviews with him. She had to submit questions in advance. Billings then prepared responses and read them aloud to her.

Death
On May 28, 1981, Billings died in his sleep following a heart attack in his Manhattan apartment.  His dying wish was for the young Kennedy men to carry his casket to its final resting place. When they arrived at the cemetery, it was already in place to be lowered. The young Kennedys took the casket and carried it around the gravesite before returning it to the burial plot. He is buried in Allegheny Cemetery in Pittsburgh, Pennsylvania.

Literature
  John F. Kennedy ; Kirk LeMoyne Billings: Das geheime Tagebuch : Europa 1937, Oliver Lubrich (Hrsg.), Wien : DVB Verlag, 2021, 
  Jack and Lem - John F. Kennedy and Lem Billings - The Untold Story of an Extraordinary Friendship, David Pitts, New York, Da Capo Press, 2007, 
  Jackie and Me: a Novel, Louis Bayard, Workman Publishing, New York, 2022, ISBN 978-1-64375-035-4

See also
JFK: Reckless Youth

References

Sources
 Peter Collier and David Horowitz, The Kennedys: An American Drama (San Francisco: Encounter Books, 2002)
 Nigel Hamilton, JFK: Reckless Youth (NY: Random House, 1992)
 David Michaelis, The Best of Friends: Profiles of Extraordinary Friendships (NY: Morrow, 1983)
 Geoffrey Perret, Jack: A Life Like No Other (NY: Random House, 2002)
 Sally Bedell Smith, Grace and Power: The Private World of the Kennedy White House (NY: Random House, 2004)
 David Pitts, Jack and Lem: The Untold Story of an Extraordinary Friendship (NY: Carroll & Graf, 2007), 
 Gore Vidal, Palimpsest'' (NY: Random House, 1995)

1916 births
1981 deaths
Burials at Allegheny Cemetery
Choate Rosemary Hall alumni
Harvard Business School alumni
Kennedy administration personnel
LGBT people from Pennsylvania
Military personnel from Pittsburgh
Princeton University alumni
United States Navy reservists
American Field Service personnel of World War II
United States Navy officers
United States Navy personnel of World War II